Robert Baillie (1602–1662) was a Scottish divine and writer.

Robert Baillie may also refer to:
 Robert Baillie (priest) (1724–1806), Anglican priest in Ireland
 Baillie of Jerviswood (c. 1634–1684), implicated in the Rye House Plot
 Robert Baillie of Westwood, Baillie, British engineer

See also
 Robert Baillie-Hamilton (1828–1891), British politician
 Robert Bailey (disambiguation)